"Drinking in L.A." is a song by Canadian electronica collective Bran Van 3000, released as the band's debut single in 1997. It was the last song to be recorded for the band's debut studio album, Glee (1997). Of the song, James Di Salvio has said "It was almost like one of those movies where an animated blue bird swings by over the real live footage. It's cheesy, but I knew in my heart it was a hit."

"Drinking in L.A." was featured in television commercials for Rolling Rock beer in the United Kingdom, which contributed to its chart success in that region, peaking at number three on the UK Singles Chart in August 1999. It also reached the top 10 in Iceland, Italy, Norway and Sweden, as well as number 35 in their native Canada.

Background
After a heavy night of drinking, James Di Salvio woke up face-down on a lawn in West Hollywood. With a serious headache, he asked himself: "What the hell am I doing, drinking in L.A.?"

Critical reception
Stephen Thomas Erlewine from AllMusic said that Bran Van 3000 is a "bizarre, stylish mix of club music, techno, hip-hop, lounge and kitsch-pop", adding that the song is "great". Chuck Taylor from Billboard described it as a "atmospheric gem" and "terrifically quirky, with a more or less spoken verse accompanied by a chorale of dreamy background vocals, catcalls, and eerie sounds both sung and spoken and coming at you from all sides." He stated that "there's a hook there, too, as rich and textured as any more clearly defined pop offering. Instrumentally, you couldn't ask for more, with trancy to fi production". He also complimented it as "glorious and deliciously creative". Scottish newspaper Daily Record noted its "slacker hip-hop and brilliant vocals". Stuart Bailie from NME wrote, "At least 'Drinking In LA' has a point of sorts, a development on the lotus-eater myth. Only now are the hedonists sobering up on Venice Beach, California, troubled by an imminent career crisis. Nice tune, too." A reviewer from Sunday Mirror rated it nine out of ten, declaring it as "one of those oh so wacky tunes that creep under your summer skin and won't budge. Sounds like Beck and will be huge."

Music video 
The music video for the song was directed by Adam Courneya. Ilana Kronick from The Gazette wrote, "In short, the clip for Drinking in L.A. is a visual representation of Bran Van's electro-pop cross-breeding. A veritable bouillabaisse of teched-out trends, digi-rock references and clubby stylings, the video — much like the group — is a trip through the '90s cool pop standards."

Track listings

 Canadian promo CD
 "Drinking in L.A." (caller intro) – 3:53
 "Drinking in L.A." (no caller intro) – 3:53

 US maxi-CD single and UK CD re-release
 "Drinking in L.A." (edit) – 3:34
 "Drinking in L.A." (Fink mix) – 5:36
 "Drinking in L.A." (Zoobone mix) – 3:56

 UK original CD single
 "Drinking in L.A." (edit) – 3:34
 "The Problem with Sheldon" – 1:23
 "Drinking in L.A." (Fink mix) – 5:36
 "Drinking in L.A." (Zoobone mix) – 3:56

 UK cassette single
 "Drinking in L.A." (edit) – 3:34
 "The Problem with Sheldon" – 1:23
 "Drinking in L.A." (Fink mix) – 5:37

 European and Australian maxi-CD single
 "Drinking in L.A." (edit) – 3:34
 "Thinking in L.A." – 5:42
 "Drinking in L.A." (Fink mix) – 5:36
 "Drinking in L.A." (album version) – 3:56

Charts and certifications

Weekly charts

Year-end charts

Certifications

Release history

References

External links
 

1997 debut singles
1997 songs
Bran Van 3000 songs
Canadian pop songs
Capitol Records singles
Songs about alcohol
Songs about Los Angeles